Live Music – Europe 2010 is a live album by Joe Jackson.

Recordings for this album were made at the following locations:

 La Luciole in Alençon, France on 22 October 2010
 La Carenne in Brest, France on 23 October 2010
 Avo Sessions in Basel, Switzerland on 31 October 2010
 Paradiso music venue in Amsterdam, Netherlands on 7 November 2010
 Gloria Theatre in Cologne, Germany on 8 November 2010
 Postbahnhof in Berlin, Germany on 11 November 2010

Track listing
All songs written and arranged by Joe Jackson, except where noted.

"Fools in Love" was available as a free download bonus track via the official Joe Jackson website.

Personnel 
Musicians 
 Joe Jackson – piano, synthesizer, melodica, shaker, vocals
 Graham Maby – bass, vocals
 Dave Houghton – electric and acoustic drums, loops, vocals

Production
 Joe Jackson – arrangements, producer
 George Cowan – recording engineer
 Blackpete – mixing engineer
 Tilmann Ilse, Martin Schattenberg – digital editing
 Greg Calbi – mastering engineer
 Ed Sherman – art direction
 Anabel Ganske – photography

References

2011 albums
Joe Jackson (musician) albums
Razor & Tie live albums